Rhynchospora brachychaeta, known by the common name of West Indian beaksedge, is a member of the sedge family, Cyperaceae. It is a perennial herb, found in wetlands of the southeastern United States, the Caribbean, Central America, and Guyana.

Rhynchospora brachychaeta grows up to 20 inches tall, and may be found in pine savannas or savanna bogs, especially in moist areas where sandy soil has been recently disturbed. Its reddish-brown spikelets bloom from May through November.

References

External links

brachychaeta
Flora of Alabama
Flora of Florida
Flora of Georgia (U.S. state)
Flora of South Carolina
Flora of Cuba
Flora of the Dominican Republic
Flora of Puerto Rico
Flora of Belize
Flora of Honduras
Flora of Nicaragua
Flora of Guyana
Plants described in 1871